The Thirteenth East Asia Summit was held at the Suntec Singapore Convention and Exhibition Centre in Central Area, Singapore on November 14–15, 2018. The East Asia Summit is an annual meeting of national leaders from the East Asian region and adjoining countries. East Asia Summit has evolved as forum for strategic dialogue and cooperation on political, security and economic issues of common regional concern and plays an important role in the regional architecture.

Attending delegations
The heads of state and heads of government of the eighteen countries participated in the summit. The host of the 2018 East Asian Summit is also the chairperson of ASEAN, the Prime Minister of Singapore, Lee Hsien Loong.

U.S. President Donald Trump did not attend the summit but U.S. Vice President Mike Pence attended on his behalf.

Gallery

References

2018 conferences
2018 in international relations
21st-century diplomatic conferences (Asia-Pacific)
ASEAN meetings
2018 in Singapore